Metropolitan Stadium (often referred to as "the Met", "Met Stadium", or now "the Old Met" to distinguish from the Metrodome) was an outdoor sports stadium in the north central United States, located in Bloomington, Minnesota, a suburb of Minneapolis.

The Minneapolis Millers minor league baseball team was the original tenant from 1956 to 1960, but Metropolitan Stadium was best known as the home of the American League's Minnesota Twins and the Minnesota Vikings of the National Football League (NFL); both played at the "Met" for 21 seasons, from 1961 through 1981. The Minnesota Kicks of the North American Soccer League (NASL) also played there from 1976 to 1981.

Southwest of the airport, the stadium site is now the Mall of America, which opened in 1992.

History

Origins and construction
Beginning in 1953, inspired by the Boston Braves' move to Milwaukee, Gerald Moore, the president of the Minneapolis Chamber of Commerce, led the drive to lure a major league team to Minnesota by constructing a modern stadium built to major league specifications. After the rejection of numerous sites, a stadium committee appointed by Moore approved a  plot of farmland in Bloomington. The stadium would replace Nicollet Park as the home of the American Association's Minneapolis Millers. The site was approximately equidistant from the downtowns of Minneapolis and St. Paul, and it was believed this would be the best location for a prospective major league team.

After a plan by architects Thorshov & Cerny won approval, groundbreaking was scheduled to begin on June 20, 1955. The construction was almost delayed, however, when the owners of the property began a protest, claiming they had not yet been paid. One of these owners created a barricade of farm equipment along his property line that ran directly through the future infield. The dispute was settled in time for the groundbreaking to move forward as planned. Many spectators and dignitaries attended the groundbreaking, including Minneapolis mayor Eric G. Hoyer and several members of the Minneapolis Millers.

On February 7, 1956, an accident occurred on the construction site when a portable heater used to cure concrete exploded in the stadium's basement. After $50,000 of repairs and a three-week delay in construction, Metropolitan Stadium opened in time to hold its first game, a minor league contest between the Millers and the Wichita Braves on April 24 of that year. (At the time of its opening, the stadium still lacked an official name; the park was not named until a July announcement declaring it "Metropolitan Stadium".)

In the 1950s, major league owners Calvin Griffith and Horace Stoneham called the stadium the finest facility in the minors; Stoneham added that "there were not two better" major league stadiums of the time (although not specifying which specific two he thought were the Met's equal) The Millers were then the top farm team of Stoneham's New York Giants, and there was some hope or expectation that the Giants might relocate there. Under major league rules of the time, by virtue of owning the Millers, the Giants owned the major league rights to Minneapolis. Negotiations were also held with Griffith's Washington Senators, as well as the Cincinnati Reds, Cleveland Indians, and Philadelphia Athletics. However, the Giants chose to follow the Brooklyn Dodgers to the west coast at the urging of Dodgers owner Walter O'Malley, who owned the Millers' crosstown rivals, the St. Paul Saints. San Francisco had long been home to the Pacific Coast League's San Francisco Seals, the top farm team of the Boston Red Sox. As part of the deal, the Millers' parent team then became the Red Sox, who had no plans to move anywhere in the foreseeable future.

Multiple exhibition games featuring Major League teams were held at the Met at this time; a game between the Detroit Tigers and Cincinnati Reds was held at the Met in 1957, and a matchup between the Senators and the Philadelphia Phillies was held shortly after the 1958 All-Star break. The latter game brought 15,990 fans to the stadium, including Calvin Griffith, who described the stadium as "terrific."

Baseball and football

In October 1960, Calvin Griffith announced that his Washington Senators would move to Metropolitan Stadium as the Minnesota Twins. The Twins played their first home game on April 21, 1961, with a loss to the new Washington Senators (now the Texas Rangers). The Millers and Saints were then promptly folded by Major League Baseball. To ready the stadium for the Twins, a $9 million renovation increased the seating capacity from about 22,000 to over 30,000 by the completion of the Twins' inaugural season. During the Twins' first ten seasons at the Met, they outdrew the average American League team each year.

The National Football League (NFL) was also interested in placing a team at the Met. Conversations were had with Violet Bidwill Wolfner, owner of the Chicago Cardinals, about moving her team to the stadium. The Cardinals moved two of their 1959 regular season home games against the Philadelphia Eagles (October 25) (att: 20,112) and New York Giants (November 22) (att: 26,625) to Bloomington. A preseason football game was held each September at the Met for its first five years, 1956 through 1960:

September 15,  – Pittsburgh Steelers 14 Philadelphia Eagles 12 (att: 14,742)
September 21,  – Green Bay 10 Pittsburgh 10 (att: 17,226)
September 21,  – Chicago Cardinals 31 Green Bay 24 (att: 18,520)
September 20,  – Green Bay 13 Pittsburgh 10 (att: 18,018)
September 11,  – Green Bay 28 Dallas Cowboys 23 (att: 20,151)

The Met finally got a football team when the new American Football League (AFL) announced Minneapolis–St. Paul as one of its charter cities for the inaugural 1960 season. As it turned out, the year's delay worked to the Vikings' benefit. By the time the Vikings played their first game, the Twins had moved in and the Met had been expanded to befit its new status as a big-league stadium. (The Chicago Cardinals, after playing two games in Bloomington in 1959, announced in March 1960 that they were moving to St. Louis.)

The park had a disjointed, skeletal feel; it was obvious that it had once been a minor league baseball stadium. For instance, when bleachers were erected to expand the stadium for the Twins, no concourse was built to connect them to the rest of the stadium. Due to this design flaw, fans in the bleachers literally had to leave the stadium to get to the grandstand. Unlike most multipurpose stadiums built during this time, there were very few bad seats for baseball. The stadium was built using cantilever construction for the overhanging decks, eliminating posts that blocked the fans' view. It was well known as a hitter's park; its short foul lines— to left (east),  to right (south)—were particularly friendly to pull hitters such as Harmon Killebrew. The 330 marker in right was actually closer to right-center, leading to speculation that right field was even closer. Since the Met was built in 1956, however, this would not have been a problem for the Twins; baseball required all parks built after 1958 to have foul lines of at least . Met Stadium distance signs included meters 1974–77. The diamond was aligned southeast (home plate to center field); recommended alignment is east-northeast.

The Met was often considered less than ideal for football. The gridiron ran from around third base to right field (north-south), with barely enough room to fit the playing field and end zones. Wooden bleachers were brought onto the field during football season to bring fans closer to the game. For 1965, a large double-decked grandstand was installed in left field to replace the temporary wooden bleachers. The Vikings actually paid for this new grandstand in return for reduced rent; this location was prime sideline seating in the football configuration. This left the Met with the unique configuration of a double deck in left field, and bleachers behind third base. The left-field grandstand was originally planned to be capable of sliding toward or away from the gridiron (as Denver's Mile High Stadium later would be), but that part of the project was never realized.

The Met provided an overwhelming home-field advantage for the Vikings late in the season and in the playoffs due to Minnesota's famously cold temperatures. The Vikings hosted ten playoff games at the Met and won seven of them.

In the 1965 baseball season, both the All-Star Game and the World Series were played at Metropolitan Stadium, one of the few times that coincidence has happened since the former event was inaugurated in 1933. (Game 7 of that year's World Series drew 50,596 fans to the Met, the only time a baseball crowd exceeded 50,000 and remained its attendance record for baseball.) The Vikings hosted and won the 1969 NFL Championship Game at the stadium, the last NFL game prior to the  merger.

Soccer and other events

Metropolitan Stadium was the home of the Minnesota Kicks soccer team from 1976 until the team folded in November 1981. The Kicks, members of the North American Soccer League (NASL), were highly anticipated in Minnesota and had to delay their first game at the Met by fifteen minutes to accommodate the large crowd waiting to buy tickets. To help speed things along, the Kicks' owners let two thousand fans enter the stadium for free. An NASL attendance record was set one month later, when Pelé and the New York Cosmos drew 46,164 fans to Metropolitan Stadium. Large crowds continued for the Kicks, who drew 41,505 for that year's opening playoff game. Four days later, another record was set when 49,571 fans came to see the Kicks defeat San Jose, 3–1. The team enjoyed great success in their first four seasons in Minnesota, winning a division title each year. Attendance dipped toward the end of the franchise's history, however, with an average of 16,605 per game in 1981, their final season. The size of the field for soccer games was 100 by 72 yards 1976–78 and 104 by 72 yards 1979–81.

Concerts
The Met also hosted multiple concerts.

Wrestling
Numerous wrestling matches were held at Metropolitan Stadium, including contests featuring Hard Boiled Haggerty, Bob Geigel, Wilbur Snyder, Kay Noble, Lord Littlebrook, Verne Gagne, Gene Kiniski, Rene Goulet, Larry Hennig, Hans Schmidt, Mad Dog Vachon and Dick the Bruiser.

Final years and demise
Although the Met was responsible for bringing MLB and the NFL to the Twin Cities, it had not aged well. By the early 1970s, the Vikings were making noises about moving out. For instance, there was no prospect of building permanent seats along third base. The Vikings weren't willing to pay to build seats in an area that would have been in the end zone in the football configuration, and the Twins couldn't afford it. Discussions for a new stadium actually began in 1970, with six years remaining in both the Twins' and Vikings' leases. At one point, there were plans to place a dome over Metropolitan Stadium, or build a new football stadium located between the Met and the Met Center, which had opened in 1967 just north of the Met. 

While the initial talks focused on a stadium for the Vikings, the Twins quickly joined the discussions. The idea of a dome was particularly appealing to Griffith given the bitterly cold weather that is common in the Twin Cities early and late in baseball season. This accelerated the push for construction of a new stadium, the Hubert H. Humphrey Metrodome, which was completed in 1982.

However, it is very likely that a new stadium would have been needed in any event, as the Met was not well maintained. By the park's final season, railings in the grandstand's third deck had become a major safety hazard. Additionally, players had begun to complain about the quality of the field; the infield in particular was considered the worst in the majors. Additionally, as part of the AFL–NFL merger, the NFL declared that stadiums with less than 50,000 seats were inadequate for its needs; at its height the Met only seated 49,700 people for football (48,400 at the time of closure). However, the Vikings would not even consider playing at the University of Minnesota's Memorial Stadium even on a temporary basis.

Rumors abounded that the Metropolitan Sports Facilities Commission, which by then had taken over the stadium from the city of Minneapolis, had deliberately let the Met go to seed in order to aid the push for the Metrodome.

The Minnesota Kicks' last regular season game at Met Stadium was a 2–1 victory over the Dallas Tornado on August 19, 1981. A week later, the team's last game at the Met was a 1-0 shoot-out playoff victory over the Tulsa Roughnecks. The team's last game played was a home playoff loss, 3–0 to the Fort Lauderdale Strikers, on September 6, 1981. The game was moved to Memorial Stadium due to a scheduling conflict with the Twins.

The Twins played their last game at the Met on September 30, 1981, losing to the Kansas City Royals 5–2 on a rainy afternoon. The night before the final game, home plate was stolen, and after the final game ended, hundreds of fans gathered on the field, searching (mostly unsuccessfully) for mementoes.

The Vikings played their last game on December 20, 1981, dropping a 10–6 decision to the Kansas City Chiefs. Fans, sensing that this was the final game of any sort at the stadium, were more determined to claim souvenirs. In preparation, the Vikings tripled their security force for the contest. In the game's final minutes, many of the 41,110 fans in attendance began dismantling seats and bleachers, and thousands stormed the field once the game ended. The goal posts were torn down, pieces of the field were dug up, and speakers and lightbulbs on the scoreboard were removed. Hundreds of injuries were reported, mostly minor scrapes and bruises but also multiple head injuries sustained during the melee.

Met Stadium was officially abandoned when the Vikings and the Twins moved to the Metrodome in January 1982, and the Kicks folded after the 1981 soccer season. For the next three years, Met Stadium sat unused, decaying, and highly vandalized. Demolition kickoff for Metropolitan Stadium started in 1985 on January 28, and continued for the next four months. After the rubble was cleared, the lot sat vacant for several years, although the nearby Met Center continued to provide entertainment for NHL hockey fans for another decade.

After the Met

The Mall of America, which opened in 1992, stands on the site of what is now nostalgically called "the Old Met." A brass plaque in the shape of home plate, embedded in the floor in the northwest corner of Nickelodeon Universe, commemorates the site's days as a sports venue by marking where home plate once sat. Near the opposite corner, mounted high on the wall, is a red stadium seat denoting the precise landing spot (including elevation) of Harmon Killebrew's  home run, a blast to the upper deck in deep left-center field on June 3, 1967. This was the longest homer of Killebrew's career, and the longest ever hit in Metropolitan Stadium. The Met's outfield seating featured green bleacher-style benches and seats, yet the seat the ball hit was painted red and could be seen from all other seats in the stadium.

For a time, there was talk of building a new park for the Twins on the old Met site that would be connected to the Mall of America. However, the terms of the agreement in which the land was sold to Triple Five Group, owners of the Mall of America, do not allow another stadium to be built on the site. Even without this to consider, the site is now directly in a flight path for Minneapolis–St. Paul International Airport.

The old flagpole at the stadium was purchased by the Minneapolis/Richfield American Legion Post when the stadium was razed.

Photo gallery: abandonment
A series of photographs taken in the mid-1980s during Metropolitan Stadium's abandonment.

References

External links

Hail Mary pass
Reference to longest home run
Base from Metropolitan Stadium, Minnesota Historical Society
Tribute page (BallparkMagic)
News coverage of the Vikings' last game at the Met (YouTube)
1978 Minnesota Kicks game
1972 softball practice at the Met
December 1981: Last Vikings game at Met Stadium ends in melee

American football venues in Minnesota
Baseball venues in Minnesota
1956 establishments in Minnesota
1985 disestablishments in Minnesota
Sports venues in Minneapolis–Saint Paul
Sports venues completed in 1956
Demolished sports venues in Minnesota
Defunct American football venues in the United States
Defunct baseball venues in the United States
Defunct Major League Baseball venues
Defunct National Football League venues
m
Defunct soccer venues in the United States
Minnesota Twins stadiums
Minnesota Vikings stadiums
Buildings and structures in Bloomington, Minnesota
North American Soccer League (1968–1984) stadiums
Sports venues demolished in 1985